As a newspaper, the Romsey Examiner served the small rural village of Romsey which is set in the Mount Macedon, Victoria. The town is 65 kilometres north west of Melbourne, Australia, and about 15 km south of Lancefield.

Surrounded on three sides by the Great Dividing Range, the town of Five Mile Creek was officially recognised in 1858, but only six weeks later it was renamed Romsey. Reasons for the change are unclear.

By the mid-19th century, the traffic between Melbourne and the Bendigo goldfields spurred a development boom for Romsey as a town.  Along with the Romsey Examiner the district was also served by Lancefield Examiner and Romsey Advocate.

Archives 
The microfilm archive of the newspaper held at the State Library of Victoria spans 4 Jan 1883 to 24 December 1920. The Kilmore Historical Society has an identical collection which has been housed at the Kilmore Library since its opening on 6 September 1996.

References 
The Genealogical Society of Victoria publishes Romsey & Districts ...Genealogical References from Newspapers which draws on material originally published in the Romsey Examiner from 2 January 1903 through to 11 September 1903; and 18 September 1903 through to 5 August 1904. It also includes the births and deaths notices, and the in memoriam for 1912 to 1914.

Defunct newspapers published in Victoria (Australia)